My Filthy Spirit Bomb is the debut solo studio album by American rapper G-Mo Skee from Richmond, California. It was released on December 2, 2016 via Majik Ninja Entertainment. Recording sessions took place at the Blap Cave in Vallejo. Production was handled by Chase Moore, C-Lance, David Rothbard, Fritz, Hopsin, Kage, Mok Beats, Nobe, Seven and YpOnTheBeat. It features guest appearances from the Inf Gang, Hopsin, Twiztid and D12 among others.

Music videos were released for "Honey Badger", "G", "Human Cloth", "Filthnificent" and "My Filthy Spirit Bomb". The album peaked at #191 on the Billboard 200, at #10 on the Top R&B/Hip-Hop Albums, at #4 on the Top Rap Albums and at #9 on the Independent Albums in the United States.

Track listing 
Credits adapted from Spotify.

Personnel

Jaron Johnson – main performer, art direction, album concept
Nobe Infgang – featured artist (track 8), producer (tracks: 1, 8, 11, 12, 19), recording, engineering
J. Cash – featured artist (track 8), recording, engineering
Crowda – featured artist (track 8)
Jaylin Johnson – featured artist (track 11)
Linzy Brighton – featured artist (track 11)
Kuzzn Bank – featured artist (tracks: 13, 17), recording, engineering
Mouton – featured artist (track 13)
KJ – featured artist (track 13)
Marcus Jamal Hopson – featured artist & producer (track 14)
Katz – featured artist (track 14)
James "Madrox" Spaniolo – featured artist (track 14), art direction
Paul "Monoxide" Methric – featured artist (track 14), art direction
Rufus Arthur Johnson – featured artist (track 19)
Von Carlisle – featured artist (track 19)
Ondre Moore – featured artist (track 19)
Michael "Seven" Summers – producer (tracks: 2, 3, 6, 10, 14, 16, 18)
YpOnTheBeat – producer (tracks: 4, 17), recording, engineering
Craig "C-Lance" Lanciani – producer (tracks: 5, 9)
MOK Beats – producer (track 7)
Fritz – producer (track 11)
Kage – producer (track 13)
Chase Moore – producer (track 15)
David Rothbard – producer (track 18)
The Jokerr – mixing, mastering
Matt Oleksiak – mixing (track 5)
E-Dubb – mixing (track 8)
George Vhalakis – art direction, management
Michael Winagar – art direction
Eric Shetler – design, layout
Mark Kosobucki – design
Marc Nader – photography

Charts

References

External links

2016 albums
Majik Ninja Entertainment albums
Hip hop albums by American artists
Albums produced by Seven (record producer)